The thirty-first season of the animated television series The Simpsons premiered on Fox in the United States on September 29, 2019, and ended on May 17, 2020. Al Jean continues as showrunner, a position he has held since the thirteenth season. Matt Selman also contributed as showrunner for the episodes "Go Big or Go Homer", "Livin La Pura Vida", "Thanksgiving of Horror", "The Miseducation of Lisa Simpson", "Bart the Bad Guy", "Highway to Well" and "The Hateful Eight-Year-Olds".

Episodes

Production

Development 
This season features the first scripts credited to writers Max Cohn and Elisabeth Kiernan Averick. Comedian and writer Pete Holmes also both wrote and guest-starred in the two-part "Warrin' Priests" episodes, making him the third freelance writer to do so after Ricky Gervais and Seth Rogen. While in "Warrin' Priests" Holmes plays the character of Bode, he had previously guest-starred in season 30 premiere "Bart's Not Dead" as a different character. The episode "The Incredible Lightness of Being a Baby" was delayed from the previous season, with the original intent to air it instead of "I'm Just a Girl Who Can't Say D'oh" on April 7, 2019. The episode was put on hold after the show's producers decided to make a short film related to the episode involving Maggie and another baby named Hudson titled Playdate with Destiny as well. The short film premiered on February 29, 2020, attached to advanced screenings of the Disney/Pixar release Onward with "The Incredible Lightness of Being a Baby" serving as a sequel to it.

In April 2020, the show joined the rest of Fox's Animation Domination lineup in a partnership with Caffeine for the AniDom Beyond Show, a recap show hosted by Andy Richter. The hour-long program featured interviews with guests and live interactivity with fans online, with recaps for the episodes that aired through April and May. The Simpsons episode aired on April 26 featuring Al Jean, cast member Yeardley Smith and writer and guest star Pete Holmes. On May 18, Matt Selman joined the show with other writers from the Fox Animation Domination lineup.

Animation 
Parts of this season were produced and aired during the COVID-19 pandemic, which delayed or canceled the production of many television productions, but as an animated production, this took less of a toll on the show than most live-action ones. Executive producer James L. Brooks encouraged the staff to begin working from their homes in early March 2020, before California's stay-at-home order was declared. In an interview with The Hollywood Reporter in late March 2020, Al Jean stated, "Production hasn't skipped a day or lost a beat. We intend to do the 22 shows we were contracted to do... There's been no change in how we do things."

Casting 
It is the last season to feature the voice talents of recurring co-star Russi Taylor who died on July 26, 2019, and had been with the show since the first season voicing characters such as Martin Prince, Sherri and Terri and Üter Zörker. Taylor's characters were adopted during this season's production cycle by voice actress Grey DeLisle starting with the episode "Marge the Lumberjill", though the last episode to feature Taylor would be "Thanksgiving of Horror" which aired afterwards due to being part of the prior season's production run. Several recurring guests made return appearances, including four stints from Joe Mantegna reprising his role of mobster Fat Tony, four different roles from Dawnn Lewis, Natasha Lyonne voicing Krusty's daughter Sophie again, Glenn Close as Homer's mother Mona Simpson, Kelsey Grammer as Sideshow Bob, Jon Lovitz as Artie Ziff, and Werner Herzog and Michael York as new characters Dr. Lund and Clayton respectively.

The season features guest appearances from John Mulaney, Michael Rapaport, Jason Momoa, Bob Odenkirk, Jane Goodall, Asia Kate Dillon, Fortune Feimster, Scott Bakula, Steve Ballmer, Zach Woods, Beanie Feldstein, Ed "Too Tall" Jones, Jim Parsons, Taran Killam, Dr. Drew Pinsky, Billy Porter, Kevin Smith, Joey King, Lilly Singh and Cate Blanchett. Black Mirror creator Charlie Brooker has a cameo in a referential segment of "Thanksgiving of Horror" while the episode "Bart the Bad Guy" features Marvel Cinematic Universe producers Kevin Feige and the Russo Brothers in parody roles, along with Maria Hill actress Cobie Smulders. "The Hateful Eight-Year-Olds" features Riverdale stars Camila Mendes, Madelaine Petsch and Lili Reinhart playing three girls who bully Lisa.

Music 
Also in "The Hateful Eight-Year-Olds", members of the band Weezer voiced the members of cover band Sailor's Delight, performed the main theme song at the end of the episode as themselves and also debuted their song "Blue Dream" within the episode. Musician Jill Sobule wrote and performed an original song for the episode "Marge the Lumberjill" and John Legend also performed an original song for "The Miseducation of Lisa Simpson" while guest-starring with his wife Chrissy Teigen.

Reception

Ratings

Accolades
In early December 2019, it was announced that three episodes had been nominated for Writers Guild of America Award for Outstanding Writing in Animation for the 72nd Writers Guild of America Awards, resulting in The Simpsons having the most nominations overall that year. The writers and episodes nominated were John Frink for "Go Big or Go, Homer," Brian Kelley for "Livin' La Pura Vida" and Dan Vebber for "Thanksgiving of Horror" and on February 1, 2020, it was announced that Vebber and "Thanksgiving of Horror" had won.

Only a few days after the WGA nominees were listed, the show also received a nomination for the Critics' Choice Television Award for Best Animated Series, but lost to Bojack Horseman when winners were announced at the 10th Critics' Choice Television Awards on January 12, 2020.

On July 28, 2020, it was announced the show had received three nominations for the 72nd Primetime Creative Arts Emmy Awards. "Thanksgiving of Horror" was nominated for Primetime Emmy Award for Outstanding Animated Program, while both Nancy Cartwright and Hank Azaria were up for the Primetime Emmy Award for Outstanding Character Voice-Over Performance. Cartwright was nominated for playing Bart Simpson, Nelson Muntz, Ralph Wiggum and Todd Flanders for the episode "Better Off Ned" and Azaria for his roles of Professor Frink, Moe Szyslak, Chief Wiggum, Carl Carlson, Cletus Spuckler, Kirk Van Houten and Captain McCallister in "Frinkcoin". On September 19, 2020 it was announced however that Rick and Morty won the award for Outstanding Animated Program, while Maya Rudolph picked up the voice-acting award for her work in Big Mouth.

Controversy
It was during the run of this season that longtime voice actor Hank Azaria announced that he was officially stepping down from voicing Apu Nahasapeemapetilon, a character he had played since the episode "The Telltale Head" from the first season. The character and Azaria's portrayal of him had come under scrutiny since the release of Hari Kondabolu's 2017 documentary The Problem with Apu. Apu's portrayal came under scrutiny again when the Simpsons staff referenced the criticism as being too politically correct in the season 29 episode "No Good Read Goes Unpunished" which resulted in backlash from some people concerned about the issue who felt that the response was immature. Azaria said that it was a mutual decision made between himself and the senior staff, stating, "all we know there is I won't be doing the voice anymore unless there's some way to transition it or something."

References

External links

Page from Fox, including streaming video of episodes

Simpsons season 31
2019 American television seasons
2020 American television seasons